Florian Schikowski (born 10 June 1998) is a Polish professional footballer who plays as a defensive midfielder for TVD Velbert. Born and raised in Germany, he also holds German citizenship.

He is the younger brother of fellow footballer Patrick Schikowski.

References

External links
 

1998 births
Living people
German people of Polish descent
Footballers from Düsseldorf
Polish footballers
German footballers
Association football midfielders
Poland youth international footballers
Regionalliga players
Ekstraklasa players
Lechia Gdańsk players
SV 19 Straelen players
German expatriate footballers
German expatriate sportspeople in Poland
Expatriate footballers in Poland